The 1970s Soviet Union aliyah was the mass immigration of Soviet Jews to Israel after the Soviet Union lifted its ban on Jewish refusenik emigration in 1971. More than 150,000 Soviet Jews immigrated during this period, motivated variously by religious or ideological aspiration, economic opportunity, and a desire to escape anti-Semitic discrimination.

This wave of immigration was followed two decades later by a larger aliyah at the end of the Soviet Union.

Background

In 1967, the USSR broke diplomatic relations with Israel in the wake of the Six-Day War. During this time, popular discrimination against Soviet Jewry increased, led by an anti-Semitic propaganda campaign in the state-controlled mass media. By the end of the 1960s, Jewish cultural and religious life in the Soviet Union suffered from a strict policy of discrimination. This state-sponsored atheism persecution denied Jews the ethnic-cultural rights experienced by other Soviet ethnic groups.

Emigration policy
After the Dymshits–Kuznetsov hijacking affair in 1970 following the crackdown, international condemnations caused the Soviet authorities to increase emigration quotas. Between 1960 and 1970, only 4,000 people had left the USSR. The number rose to 250,000 in the following decade.

In 1972, the USSR imposed a so-called "diploma tax" on would-be emigrants who had received higher education in the USSR. The fee reached as high as twenty times an annual salary. This measure was designed to combat the brain drain caused by the growing emigration of Soviet Jews and other members of the intelligentsia to the West. Following international protests, the Kremlin soon revoked the tax, but continued to sporadically impose various limitations.

Emigration
Prior to the Six-Day War, few Soviet Jews emigrated to Israel. Israel's decisive victory changed the opinion of many Soviet Jews towards Israel. After the war, many Soviet Jews began to demand the right to move to Israel. However, given a choice, many Soviet Jews chose to emigrate to the United States.

Absorption of new immigrants in Israel

In 1968, 231 Jews were granted exit visas to Israel, followed by 3,033 in 1969. From that point on, the USSR began granting exit visas in growing numbers. During the late 1960s and the 1970s, some 163,000 Soviet Jews emigrated to Israel; mostly between 1969 and 1973.

While many Jews emigrated to Israel, others chose the United States instead. Known as "dropouts", the emigres applied for US refugee visas while waiting at transit centers in Austria and Italy. In March 1976, the "dropout rate" rose to over 50%. Most of the Soviet Jews who only wanted to emigrate to Israel out of religious and/or ideological reasons had done so by 1973.  However, the Jackson-Vanik Amendment passed by US Congress in 1974, along with additional US congressional funding for Soviet Jewish resettlement, and "reports of work and housing difficulties" in Israel due to the 1973 Yom Kippur War, created a situation for this "dropout" rate to rise, forcing 51,000 Soviet Jews from 1975 - 1980 to migrate to the US and join the 1.5 million Jews who fled the Russian Empire prior to  World War I.

Israel was concerned over the dropout rate, and suggested that Soviet emigres be flown directly to Israel from the Soviet Union or Romania. Israel argued that it needed highly skilled and well-educated Soviet Jewish immigrants for its survival. In addition to contributing to the country's economic development, Soviet immigration was also seen as a counterweight to the high fertility rate among Israeli-Arabs. In addition, Israel was concerned that the dropout rate could result in immigration being banned once again. According to Israeli Immigrant Absorption Minister Yaakov Zur, "over half of Soviet Jewish dropouts who immigrated to the United States assimilated and ceased to live as Jews within a short period of time...it could jeopardize the whole program if Jews supposedly going to Israel all wind up in Brooklyn and Los Angeles. How will the Soviets explain to their own people that it's just Jews who are allowed to emigrate to the U.S.?"

Most Soviet Jews who emigrated to Israel who had stronger Jewish identities came from the Baltic states, Moldova, and Georgia, while the "dropouts" were mainly assimilated Jews from the Russian heartland. Overall, between 1970 and 1988, some 291,000 Soviet Jews were granted exit visas, of whom 165,000 migrated to Israel, and 126,000 migrated to the United States.

See also
 Refusenik (Soviet Union)
 Dymshits–Kuznetsov hijacking affair
 Jackson–Vanik amendment
 History of the Jews in Russia and the Soviet Union
 1990s post-Soviet aliyah
 Russian Jews in Israel
 USSR anti-religious campaign (1970s–87)
Migration diplomacy
Refugees as weapons
Jewish emigration from Communist Romania

References

External links
 The Refusenik Project - a free educational resource

1970s Soviet Union
Antisemitism in the Soviet Union
Jews and Judaism in the Soviet Union
Israel–Soviet Union relations
1970s in the Soviet Union